Of Matters Great and Small is a collection of seventeen scientific essays by American writer and scientist Isaac Asimov. It was the eleventh of a series of books collecting essays from The Magazine of Fantasy and Science Fiction, although it also includes one essay from Science Digest. It was first published by Doubleday & Company in 1975.

Contents

"Constant as the Northern Star" (F&SF, August 1973)
"Signs of the Times" (September 1973)
"The Mispronounced Metal" (October 1973)
"The Figure of the Fastest" (November 1973)
"The Figure of the Farthest" (December 1973)
"The Eclipse and I" (January 1974)
"Dance of the Luminaries" (February 1974)
"The Uneternal Atoms" (March 1974)
"A Particular Matter" (April 1974)
"At Closest Range" (May 1974)
"The Double-Ended Candle" (June 1974)
"The Inevitability of Life" (Science Digest, June 1974)
"As Easy as Two Plus Three" (F&SF, July 1974)
"Updating the Asteroids" (August 1974)
"Look Long upon a Monkey" (September 1974)
"O Keen-eyed Peerer into the Future!" (October 1974)
"Skewered!" (November 1974)

References

External links
Asimovonline.com

Essay collections by Isaac Asimov
1975 books
Works originally published in The Magazine of Fantasy & Science Fiction
Doubleday (publisher) books